Kamienne  is an abandoned village in the Lesser Beskid mountains in the administrative district of Gmina Bukowsko, within Sanok County, Subcarpathian Voivodeship, in south-eastern Poland.

It is located about halfway between Bukowsko and Płonna.

History

Kamienne was founded in 1550 by Polish nobleman , when it formed part of the Kingdom of Poland. Following the First Partition of Poland, in 1772, it was annexed by Austria. By the second half of the 19th century, the village had been bought by Leopoldyna Horodyńska.

Following World War I, Poland regained independence and control of the village. Following the joint German-Soviet invasion of Poland, which started World War II in September 1939, the village was occupied by Germany. The village was burned down in the spring 1946 by the Polish Army after its Ukrainian population had been forced to relocate to Soviet Ukraine by Polish Army. From 1975 to 1998, it was administratively located in the Krosno Voivodship. The small shrine in Kamienne is very hard to get to. One has to hike through underbrush up a hill to get to it on top of needing an off-road vehicle to get to what is left of the village. The few standing buildings are just used now for hunting cabins. The small cemetery in Kamienne has no headstones but the graves are quite noticeable.

References 

Villages in Sanok County
Populated places established in 1550
1550 establishments in Poland
Former populated places in Poland